Renato Bizzozero (7 September 1912 – 10 November 1994) was a Swiss football goalkeeper who was an unused squad member for Switzerland in the FIFA World Cup in 1934 and 1938. Though he received nineteen caps, he was only ever used by FC Lugano as a reserve goalkeeper.

References

1912 births
1994 deaths
Swiss men's footballers
Switzerland international footballers
1934 FIFA World Cup players
1938 FIFA World Cup players
Association football goalkeepers
FC Lugano players
Sportspeople from Lugano